Spilogona sanctipauli is a species of fly from the family Muscidae first described by John Russell Malloch in 1921. It has a distribution across the high arctic and is a notable and important pollinator of the mountain avens. The species has been strongly correlated to successful seed setting and may be an integral character in arctic ecosystems.

References

Muscidae
Diptera of Europe
Insects described in 1921
Taxa named by John Russell Malloch